Marlene Smith may refer to:
 Marlene Smith (figure skater)
 Marlene Smith (artist)